Cape Thorvaldsen is a headland in southwest Greenland in the Kujalleq municipality.

Geography
The cape is located southeast of Cape Desolation near the settlements of Qaqortoq and Narsaq Kujalleq (Frederiksdal). The Outer Kitsissut (Torstein Islands) lie 26 km west-north-west of the cape.

References

External links
 Selection of cod by bottom trawl codends in Southwest Greenland Waters - ICNAF

Thorvaldsen